Jakaya Mrisho Kikwete (born 7 October 1950) is a Tanzanian politician who was the fourth president of Tanzania, in office from 2005 to 2015. 

Prior to his election as president, he was the Minister for Foreign Affairs from 1995 to 2005 under his predecessor, Benjamin Mkapa. He also served as the chairperson of the African Union from 2008–2009 and the chairman of the Southern African Development Community Troika on Peace, Defence and Security from 2012–2013. Kikwete who is of Kwere heritage, was born and raised in Msoga, Chalinze District in Pwani Region and attended the university of Dar es Salaam.

Education
Between 1959 and 1963 Kikwete attended Karatu Primary School and Tengeru School from 1963 to 1965, both in Arusha Region. After Tengeru, Kikwete moved back to home to Pwani Region and attended Kibaha Secondary School for his O-levels, which took place between 1966 and 1969. Then he moved to Tanga Region studied at the Tanga Technical Secondary School for his advanced level education. He graduated from the University of Dar es Salaam in 1975 with a degree in political science and public relations.

Leadership and political career

Kikwete was born at Msoga, located in the Bagamoyo District of Tanganyika, in 1950.

As a party cadre, Kikwete moved from one position to another in the party ranks and from one location to another in the service of the party. When TANU and Zanzibar's Afro-Shirazi Party (ASP) merged to form Chama Cha Mapinduzi (CCM) in 1977, Kikwete was moved to Zanzibar and assigned the task of setting up the new party's organisation and administration in the islands. In 1980, he was moved to the headquarters as administrator of the Dar es Salaam head office and head of the Defence and Security Department before moving again up-country to the regional and district party offices in Tabora Region (1981–84) and Singida Region and Nachingwea (1986–88) and Masasi District (1988) in the country's southern regions of Lindi and Mtwara respectively. In 1988, he was appointed to join the central government.

In 1994, at 44, he became one of the youngest finance ministers in the history of The United Republic of Tanzania. In December 1995, he became Minister of Foreign Affairs and International Cooperation, being appointed by President Benjamin William Mkapa of the third phase government.  He held this post for ten years, until he was elected President of the United Republic of Tanzania in December 2005, hence becoming the country's longest serving foreign minister. During his tenure in the Ministry of Foreign Affairs, Tanzania played a significant role in bringing about peace in the Great Lakes region, particularly in The Democratic Republic Of Burundi and the Democratic Republic of Congo (DRC).  Kikwete was also deeply involved in the process of rebuilding regional integration in East Africa. Specifically, several times, he was involved in a delicate process of establishing a customs union between the three countries of the East African Community (Kenya, Uganda, and Tanzania), where, for quite some time, he was a chairman of the East Africa Community's Council of Ministers.

Kikwete also participated in the initiation, and became a co-chair, of the Helsinki Process on Globalisation and Democracy. On 4 May 2005, Kikwete emerged victorious among 11 CCM members who had sought the party's nomination for presidential candidacy in the general election. After a 14 December 2005 multiparty general election, he was declared the winner by the Electoral Commission on 17 December and was sworn in as the fourth president of the United Republic of Tanzania on 21 December.

On 26 May 2013, Kikwete said at a meeting of the African Union that if President Joseph Kabila of the DRC could negotiate with the March 23 Movement, President Yoweri Museveni of Uganda and President Paul Kagame of Rwanda should be able to negotiate with the Allied Democratic Forces-National Army for the Liberation of Uganda and the Democratic Forces for the Liberation of Rwanda, respectively. In response, Museveni expressed his willingness to negotiate.

On 31 January 2016, The chairperson of the African Union Commission, Dr Nkosazana Zuma, appointed Jakaya Kikwete the African Union High Representative in Libya. Following the crisis in Libya, Kikwete's role is to lead the AU's efforts on achieving peace and stability in Libya. Later that year, he was appointed by United Nations Secretary-General Ban Ki-moon to serve as member of the Lead Group of the Scaling Up Nutrition Movement. Since 2022, he has been a co-chairing the Commission for Universal Health convened by Chatham House, alongside Helen Clark.

Personal life 
Kikwete is an avid sports enthusiast and played basketball competitively in school. He has been a patron of the Tanzania Basketball Federation for the past 10 years. He is married to Salma and they have five children.

As of 4 April 2013, Kikwete was the sixth most followed African leader on Twitter with 57,626 followers.

Honours and awards

Honours

Awards
Sullivan Honor
2007: The AAI African National Achievement Award (on behalf of Tanzania).
2009: US Doctors for Africa Award.
2011: Social Good Award from the United Nations Foundation
2011: South-South Award for Global Health, Technology and Development
2012: FANRPAN Policy Leadership Award from the Food, Agriculture and Natural Resources Policy Analysis Network.
2013: Africa's Most Impactful Leader of the Year by the Africa Leadership Magazine
2013: ICCF Mengha Award by the International Conservation Caucus Foundation
2014: Icon of Democracy Award, from The Voice Magazine (Netherlands)
2015: Leadership Excellence Award by the Pan-African Youth Union.
2015: African Achievers Award by the Institute for Good Governance in Africa.
2015: African Statesman of the Year by The African Sun Times.

Honorary academic awards

Legacy

Eponyms
Kikwete Bridge, across the Malagarasi River in western Tanzania (275 metres)
Jakaya M Kikwete Youth Park, a multi-sport facility in Dar es Salaam.
Jakaya Kikwete Cardiac Institute (JKCI), at the Muhimbili National Hospital.
Kikwete Friendship Highway, a 12 km highway in Dar es Salaam that will be constructed between Ukonga Banana in Ilala District and Chamazi in Temeke District.
Schools:
Jakaya Kikwete Primary School in Muleba District, Kagera Region
Jakaya Kikwete Secondary School in Mbulu, Manyara Region
J. M. Kikwete Secondary School in Mbozi District, Mbeya Region

References

Further reading

External links

 

 
1950 births
Chairpersons of the African Union
Chama Cha Mapinduzi politicians
Finance Ministers of Tanzania
Foreign ministers of Tanzania
Living people
People from Bagamoyo District
Presidents of Tanzania
Tanga Secondary School alumni
Tanganyika African National Union politicians
Tanzanian Muslims
University of Dar es Salaam alumni
Open University of Tanzania alumni
People from Pwani Region